Events from the year 1933 in Michigan.

Office holders

State office holders

 Governor of Michigan: William Comstock (Democrat)
 Lieutenant Governor of Michigan: Allen E. Stebbins (Democrat)
 Michigan Attorney General: Patrick H. O'Brien 
 Michigan Secretary of State: Frank D. Fitzgerald (Republican)
 Speaker of the Michigan House of Representatives: Martin R. Bradley (Democrat)
 Chief Justice, Michigan Supreme Court:

Mayors of major cities

 Mayor of Detroit: Frank Murphy (Democrat)/Frank Couzens (Republican)
 Mayor of Grand Rapids: John D. Karel
 Mayor of Flint: William H. McKeighan/Ray A. Brownell
 Mayor of Lansing: Max A. Templeton
 Mayor of Ann Arbor: H. Wirt Newkirk/Robert A. Campbell

Federal office holders

 U.S. Senator from Michigan: James J. Couzens (Republican)
 U.S. Senator from Michigan: Arthur Vandenberg (Republican) 
 House District 1: Robert H. Clancy (Democrat)/George G. Sadowski (Democrat)
 House District 2: Earl C. Michener (Republican)/John C. Lehr (Democrat)
 House District 3: Joseph L. Hooper (Republican)
 House District 4: John C. Ketcham (Republican)/George Ernest Foulkes (Democrat)
 House District 5: Carl E. Mapes (Republican)
 House District 6: Seymour H. Person (Republican)/Claude E. Cady (Democrat)
 House District 7: Jesse P. Wolcott (Republican)
 House District 8: Michael J. Hart (Democrat)
 House District 9: James C. McLaughlin (Republican)/Harry W. Musselwhite (Democrat)
 House District 10: Roy O. Woodruff (Republican)
 House District 11: Frank P. Bohn (Republican)/Prentiss M. Brown (Democrat)
 House District 12: W. Frank James (Republican)
 House District 13: Clarence J. McLeod (Republican)

Population

Sports

Baseball
 1933 Detroit Tigers season – Under manager Bucky Harris, the Tigers compiled a 75–79 record and finished in fifth place in the American League. The team's statistical leaders included Charlie Gehringer with a .325 batting average and 108 RBIs, Gehringer and Hank Greenberg with 12 home runs each, and 139 RBIs, Firpo Marberry with 16 wins, and Tommy Bridges with a 3.09 earned run average.
 1933 Michigan Wolverines baseball season - Under head coach Ray Fisher, the Wolverines compiled a 12–4 record. Michael Diffley was the team captain.

American football 

 1933 Michigan Wolverines football team – Under head coach Harry Kipke, the Wolverines compiled a 7–0–1 record, tied for the Big Ten Conference championship, and were selected as national champions by 10 selectors. 
 1933 Michigan State Spartans football team – Under head coach Charlie Bachman, the Spartans compiled a 4–2–2 record.
 1933 Detroit Titans football team – The Titans compiled a 7–1 record under head coach Gus Dorais.
 1933 Central State Bearcats football team - Under head coach George Van Bibber the Bercats compiled a 5–2–1 record.
 1933 Western State Hilltoppers football team - Under head coach Mike Gary, the Hilltoppers compiled a 3–3–1 record.
 1933 Michigan State Normal Hurons football team - Under head coach Elton Rynearson, the Hurons compiled a 6–2 record.
 1933 Detroit City College Tartars football team – The Tartars compiled a 2–5–1 record under head coach Joe Gembis.

Basketball
 1932–33 Western Michigan Broncos men's basketball team – Under head coach Buck Read, the Broncos compiled a 14–3 record.
 1932–33 Detroit Titans men's basketball team – Under head coach Lloyd Brazil, the Titans compiled a 12–5 record.
 1932–33 Michigan State Spartans men's basketball team – Under head coach Benjamin Van Alstyne, the Spartans compiled a 10–7 record.
 1932–33 Michigan Wolverines men's basketball team – Under head coach Franklin Cappon, the Wolverines compiled a 10–8 record. 
 1932–33 City College of Detroit (CCD) men's basketball team – Under coach Newman Ertell, CCD (later known as Wayne State) compiled a 7–10 record.

Ice hockey

 1932–33 Detroit Red Wings season – Under coach Jack Adams, the Red Wings compiled a 25–15–8 record, finished in second place in the National Hockey League (NHL) American Division, and lost in the playoff semi-finals to the New York Rangers. The team's statistical leaders included Herbie Lewis with 20 goals and 34 points and Lewis and Carl Voss with 14 assists each. John Ross Roach was the team's goaltender. 
 1932–33 Michigan Wolverines men's ice hockey team – Under head coach Ed Lowrey, the Wolverines compiled a 10–4–2 record.
 1932–33 Michigan Tech Huskies men's ice hockey team – Under head coach Bert Noblet, the Huskies compiled a 9–5–1 record.

Other
 Port Huron to Mackinac Boat Race – 
 Michigan Open -

Chronology of events

January

 Jan. 3, 1933 - Diego Rivera completes the north wall of his Detroit Industry Murals at the Detroit Institute of Arts.
 January 30 - The Lone Ranger made its debut on Detroit's WXYZ radio station.

February
 February 13 - Auto workers go on strike.
 February 14 - Gov. William Comstock orders the closure of all banks in Michigan to prevent a run on the banks.

March
 March 13 - Diego Rivera completes the Detroit Industry Murals.

April
 April 10 - Michigan became the first state to ratify the repeal of Prohibition. The members of Michigan's constitutional convention voted 99 to 1 in favor of repeal.

May

June

July

August

September

October

November

December
 December 24 - The Italian Hall disaster resulted in 73 deaths in a stampede after someone falsely shouted "fire" at a crowded Christmas party.

Births
 January 4 - Darris McCord, defensive end/tackle for Detroit Lions (1955–1967), in Detroit
 January 7 - Marian Ilitch, co-founder of Little Caesars Pizza with her husband, Mike Ilitch, in Dearborn, Michigan
 January 30 - Bert Zagers, halfback for the Washington Redskins (1955–1958), in Fremont, Michigan
 January 31 - Walter Beach, AFL/NFL defensive back (1960–1966), in Pontiac, Michigan
 February 17 - Colleen Howe, sports agent and wife of Gordie Howe, in Sandusky, Michigan
 April 10 - Robert Nederlander,  attorney and former president of the Nederlander Organization, in Detroit
 April 12 - Charley Lau, Major League Baseball catcher (1956–1967), in Romulus, Michigan
 April 27 - John Morrow, NFL offensive lineman (1956–1966), in Port Huron, Michigan
 May 16 - Bob Bruce, Major League Baseball pitcher (1959–1967), in Detroit
 June 10 - Chuck Fairbanks, head football coach for Oklahoma (1967-1971), New England Patriots (1973–1978), and Colorado (1979–1981), in Detroit
 August 25 - Tom Skerritt, actor (MASH, Alien, Top Gun, A River Runs Through It, Picket Fences), in Detroit
 September 1 - Gene Harris, jazz pianist in soul jazz style, in Benton Harbor, Michigan
 September 19 - Norm Masters, CFL/NFL offensive lineman (1956–1964), in Detroit
 October 30 - Warith Deen Mohammed, leader of the Nation of Islam (1975-1976) and American Society of Muslims (1976-2003), in Detroit
 November 24 - Art Walker, CFL lineman (1955–1961), in South Haven, Michigan
 December 30 - Jim Letherer, civil rights activist, in Saginaw, Michigan
 December 31 - Ken Rowe, Major League Baseball pitcher (1963–1965), in Ferndale, Michigan

Gallery of 1933 births

Deaths
 June 12 - Horace Rackham, one of the original stockholders in the Ford Motor Company and a noted philanthropist, at age 74 in Detroit
 October 7 - Jo Labadie, labor organizer, anarchist, Greenbacker, social activist, publisher, and poet, at age 83 in Detroit

Gallery of 1933 deaths

See also
 History of Michigan
 History of Detroit

References